East Samogitian Plateau is a landform in central Lithuania, the eastern part of the Samogitian Upland. It continues between the Samogitian Watershed Hill Country in the west and the Central Lithuanian Plain in the east. The Dubysa river marks its western margin, while the Šeduva Ridge and the Radviliškis Ridge mark its eastern margin.

Relief is hilly and undulated, there are flat and endorhetic troughs with lakes and swamps.

Most of the East Samogitian Plateau belongs to the Dubysa basin (with the Kražantė, Gryžuva, Dratvuo rivers). There are the Rėkyva Lake, Gauštvinis lake, Bridvaišis lake, also some large swamps as the Didysis Tyrulis (area of ), the Praviršulio Tyrulis, the Rėkyva Swamp. The eastern part of the plateau is covered by the forests (the Tytuvėnai Forest, the Kiaunoriai–Užpelkiai–Šimša Forest).

References

Landforms of Lithuania